The Florida's Natural Charity Classic is an annual golf tournament for professional women golfers on the Epson Tour, the LPGA's developmental tour. The event has been played at the Country Club of Winter Haven in Winter Haven, Florida since 2017. From 2014 to 2016, it was played at Lake Wales Country Club in Lake Wales, Florida since 2014. From 2009 to 2013, it was played at the Lake Region Yacht and Country Club in Winter Haven.

The title sponsor of the tournament is Florida's Natural Growers, an agricultural cooperative based in Lake Wales, Florida.

The tournament is a 54-hole event, as are most tour tournaments, and includes pre-tournament pro-am opportunities, in which local amateur golfers can play with the professional golfers from the tour as a benefit for local charities. The current benefiting charity is the Florida's Natural Growers Foundation.

Tournament venue through the years:
2009–2013: Lake Region Yacht and Country Club
2014–2016: Lake Wales Country Club
2017–2023: Country Club of Winter Haven

Winners

Tournament records

External links
Coverage on the Epson Tour's official site

Symetra Tour events
Golf in Florida
Recurring sporting events established in 2009
2009 establishments in Florida